Sarah Lane (born August 3, 1984) is an American ballet dancer who was a principal dancer with American Ballet Theatre (ABT). She served as a "dance double" for Natalie Portman in the 2010 film Black Swan.

Early life
Lane was born in San Francisco, California. She started training for dance at Classical Ballet Memphis in Memphis, Tennessee. Her family later moved to Rochester, New York where she continued her training at the Draper Center for Dance Education. At the age of 16 she attended the Boston Ballet's Summer Program on a full scholarship. At the North American Ballet Festival in 2000 and 2001, she won first place and received the Capezio Class Excellence Award.

In 2002 she received the highest medal in the Junior Division of the Jackson International Ballet Competition. During that time she also performed at the Kennedy Center in Washington, D.C., as a presidential scholar in the arts. Also in 2002, she won the bronze medal at the Youth America Grand Prix Competition.

Career
Lane joined American Ballet Theatre as an apprentice in August 2003, became a member of the company's corps de ballet in April 2004. Lane was the June 2007 cover model for Dance Magazine. She was appointed a Soloist in August 2007 and was promoted to Principal Dancer in September 2017. Her promotion was announced following four successful role debuts - the titular role in Giselle, Odette/Odile in Swan Lake, and a leading role in Souvenir d'un lieu cher - as part of ABT's 2017 season at the Metropolitan Opera House. She also originated the role of Princess Praline in Whipped Cream. The New York Times called Lane's debut in Giselle “distinguished.” Her term with ABT ended in 2020.

Black Swan

Lane served as a "dance double" for Natalie Portman in the 2010 film Black Swan, a psychological thriller about ballet dancers in New York City. In a March 3 blog entry for Dance Magazine, editor-in-chief Wendy Perron asked: "Do people really believe that it takes only one year to make a ballerina? We know that Natalie Portman studied ballet as a kid and had a year of intensive training for the film, but that doesn't add up to being a ballerina. However, it seems that many people believe that Portman did her own dancing in Black Swan." This led to responses from Benjamin Millepied and Aronofsky, who both defended Portman, as well as a response from Lane on the subject.

Personal life
In December 2007, Lane married Luis Ribagorda, a member of the ABT's corps de ballet. They reside in Jersey City, New Jersey.

Selected repertoire
Lane's repertory with the American Ballet Theatre includes:

Publications
 "My (Double) Life as a Black Swan." The Wall Street Journal, March 30, 2011.

References

External links 
 Sarah Lane at American Ballet Theatre
 
 ABC News video featuring Sarah Lane and Luis Ribagorda (September 25, 2008)

1984 births
Living people
American ballerinas
Prima ballerinas
21st-century American ballet dancers
American Ballet Theatre principal dancers
Princess Grace Awards winners
People from San Francisco
People from New York (state)
Dancers from New York (state)